Daphne championii is a shrub, of the family Thymelaeaceae.  It is native to China, specifically Guangxi, Guangdong, and other provinces in China.

Description
The shrub is evergreen and grows from 0.5 to 1.0 m tall.  Its branches are dense, slender, and elongated. It flowers from February to April and grows on low mountains at altitudes ranging from 200 to 650 m.

References

championii